The Fort Stockton Historic District, in Fort Stockton, Texas, is a  historic district which was listed on the National Register of Historic Places in 1973.

It includes Recorded Texas Historic Landmarks.

Historic Fort Stockton Highlights 
 Annie Riggs Memorial Museum
 Buffalo Soldier
 Camp Stockton
 Comanche People
 Comanche Springs
 Comanche War Trail
 Early Settlers and Vaqueros
 Grey Mule Saloon
 Old Pecos County Jail
 South Orient Rail Line

Illustrations

References

External links
 
 
 

	
National Register of Historic Places in Pecos County, Texas
Buildings and structures completed in 1858
Museums in Pecos County, Texas
Stockton